Revolution on Ice is the third and final studio album by Gumball. The album, released in 1994, was the only one  featuring new member Malcolm Riviera, of Velvet Monkeys, on keyboards and guitar.

It includes a cover of Blue Öyster Cult's "She's as Beautiful as a Foot" that features original BÖC Drummer Albert Bouchard.

Production
The album was recorded in Woodstock, New York, and mixed at Electric Lady Studios.

Critical reception
The Baltimore Sun called the album "a straight-ahead blast of punk energy coupled with smart pop melodies."

Track listing 
 "Revolution on the Rocks" - (Fleming)
 "Free Grazin" - (Fleming)
 "With a Little Rain" - (Fleming, Riviera)
 "Nights on Fire" - (Fleming)
 "Whatcha Gonna Do" - (Vermillion)
 "Breath Away" - (Fleming)
 "Gone to the Moon" - (Fleming)
 "It Ain't Nothin'" - (Vermillion)
 "Read the News" - (Fleming, Riviera)
 "The Boat Race" - (Spiegel, Riviera)
 "Trudge" - (Gumball)
 "She's as Beautiful as a Foot" - (Richard Meltzer, Albert Bouchard, Allen Lanier)
 "A Love Supreme" (John Coltrane) (Bonus Track) Japanese Only

Personnel 
Don Fleming - vocals, guitar, producer
Jay Spiegel - drums, percussion, vocals ("The Boat Race")
Eric Vermillion - bass, vocals ("Whatcha Gonna Do" and "It Ain't Nothin'")
Malcolm Riviera - keyboards, guitar
Technical
John Agnello - producer, mixing
Dan McLoughlin - assistant engineer
Brian Sperber - mixing assistant
John Calbi - mastering

References 

1994 albums
Columbia Records albums
Gumball (band) albums
Albums produced by John Agnello
albums produced by Don Fleming (musician)